The following radio stations broadcast on AM frequency 1150 kHz: 1150 AM is a Regional broadcast frequency, according to the U.S. Federal Communications Commission and the Canadian Radio-television and Telecommunications Commission.

In Argentina 
 LRA2 in Viedma, Chubut
 LRA51 Nacional in San José de Jáchal
 LRH202 Tupá Mbaé in Posadas, Misiones
 LT9 Brigadier Lopez in Santa Fe
 Sagrada Familia in San Justo

In Canada

In Mexico 
  in Tonala, Jalisco
 XECSAK-AM in Matehuala, San Luis Potosi
  in San Miguel Teotongo, CDMX
  in Mexicali, Baja California
  in Culiacan, Sinaloa

In the United States

References

Lists of radio stations by frequency